TFCD may refer to:

 Task Force on Climate Related Financial Disclosures
 time for CD or trade for CD – see Time for print
 tFCD, a division in the Taiwanese Canadian Association of Toronto